Brian Begley (born 20 October 1979) is an Irish sportsperson.  He plays hurling and Gaelic football with his local club Mungret/St. Paul's and was a member of the Limerick senior inter-county team in both codes from 2001 until 2007.

Playing career

Club

Begley plays his club hurling with his local Mungret/St. Paul's club and has enjoyed some success.

Inter-county

Begley first came to prominence on the inter-county scene as a member of the Limerick under-21 team.  He won a Munster title at this level in 2000 before later collecting an All-Ireland Under-21 Hurling Championship medal following a victory over Galway.  It was Limerick's first step towards three such titles in-a-row, however, Begley was over-age for the latter two victories.  By this stage, he had joined the county senior team.  Following the county's victory over Cork in the Munster Senior Hurling Championship in 2001, Limerick failed to win a game in the province until their 2007 Munster semi-final victory over Tipperary.  This was achieved following a three-game saga, however, Begley's side later lost the Munster final to Waterford.  Limerick later beat Waterford in the subsequent All-Ireland semi-final, setting up an All-Ireland final meeting with Kilkenny on 2 September 2007. While Begley scored a goal and won a penalty, Begley's side lost by seven points to Kilkenny, on a scoreline of 2-19 1-15.

Football

Begley won a Munster Under-21 Football Championship with Limerick in 2000 and played in the All Ireland Final but lost out to Tyrone. With the Limerick senior team he played in two Munster Senior Football Championship in 2003 and 2004 but lost out both times to Kerry in 2004 only after a replay.

References

Teams

1979 births
Living people
Dual players
Mungret hurlers
Mungret Gaelic footballers
Limerick inter-county hurlers
Limerick inter-county Gaelic footballers
Munster inter-provincial hurlers